Bruno Putzulu (born 24 May 1967) is a French actor, born in Toutainville, France.

Life and career 
Born to a Sardinian father, Bruno Putzulu was born and raised in Toutainville, Haute-Normandie. Although he liked football, he chose an acting career. He entered the CNSAD in 1990 and the Comédie-Française from 1994 to 2003, where he found his friend of University of Rouen, Philippe Torreton.

Torreton recommended him to Bertrand Tavernier, who hired him for his 1995 film L'Appât, which revealed him to the general public.

His strong personality led him to be dismissed by the Comédie-Française in 2002. In 2003, he played in Monsieur N. by Antoine de Caunes alongside Philippe Torreton.

Filmography

Feature films
 1994: Emmène-moi by Michel Spinosa
 1994: Jefferson in Paris by James Ivory
 1995: The Bait by Bertrand Tavernier
 1995: Marie-Louise ou la Permission by Manuel Flèche
 1995: Mécaniques célestes by Fina Torres
 1995: Les Aveux de l'innocent by Jean-Pierre Améris
 1995: Un héros très discret by Jacques Audiard
 1997: Petits Désordres amoureux by Olivier Péray
 1998: Une minute de silence by Florent Emilio Siri
 1998: Le Sourire du clown by Eric Besnard
 1999: Les Passagers by Jean-Claude Guiguet
 1999: Why Not Me? by Stéphane Giusti
 1999: Les gens qui s'aiment by Jean-Charles Tacchella
 1999: Virilité by Roman Girre
 1999: De l'amour by Jean-François Richet
 2001: Éloge de l'Amour by Jean-Luc Godard
 2001: (Entre nous) by Serge Lalou
 2001: Lulu by Jean-Henri Roger
 2002: Irene by Ivan Calbérac
 2002: Lilly's Story by Roviros Manthoulis
 2003: Les Clefs de bagnole by Laurent Baffie (simple apparition)
 2003: Dans le rouge du couchant by Edgardo Cozarinsky
 2003: Monsieur N. by Antoine de Caunes
 2003: Father and Sons by Michel Boujenah
 2003: Tout pour l'oseille by Bertrand Van Effenterre
 2004: Holy Lola by Bertrand Tavernier
 2004: Les gens honnêtes vivent en France / La gente honrada by Bob Decout
 2004: Belhorizon by Inès Rabadan
 2006: Dans les cordes by Magaly Richard-Serrano
 2007: La Fabrique des sentiments by Jean-Marc Moutout
 2014: L'Art de la fugue by Brice Cauvin

Short films
 1996: Nord pour mémoire, avant de le perdre by Isabelle Ingold and Viviane Perelmuter
 1998: Le Réceptionniste by Ivan Calbérac
 2000: Guedin by Frédy Busso

TV films
 1997: La Famille Sapajou by Élisabeth Rappeneau
 1999: Georges Dandin by Bernard Stora
 2002: La Tranchée des espoirs by Jean-Louis Lorenzi
 2003: La Place de l'autre by Roberto Garzelli
 2004: Le Temps meurtrier by Philippe Monnier
 2006: Un amour de fantôme by Arnaud Sélignac
 2006: Chez Maupassant : Deux amis by Gérard Jourd'hui
 2007: Le Diable en embuscade by Jean-Pierre Mocky
 2016: Baisers cachés by Didier Bivel

Awards
 Césars 1996 : Nominated in the category "best new actor" for Les Aveux de l'innocent by Jean-Pierre Améris
 Césars 1999 : César in the category "best new actor" for Petits Désordres amoureux by Olivier Péray

External links

 Official site
 

1967 births
Living people
People from Eure
French people of Sardinian descent
French male film actors
Most Promising Actor César Award winners
Troupe of the Comédie-Française
French male television actors
French male stage actors
20th-century French male actors
21st-century French male actors